The 1974 Astor Cup, also known as the Bologna Open or Bologna WCT, was a men's tennis tournament played on indoor carpet courts that was part of the Green Group of the 1974 World Championship Tennis circuit and took place  in Bologna, Italy. It was the second edition of the tournament and was held from 11 February through 17 February 1974. Third-seeded Arthur Ashe won the singles title and earned $10,000 first prize money.

Finals

Singles

 Arthur Ashe defeated  Mark Cox 6–4, 7–5

Doubles
 Ove Nils Bengtson /  Björn Borg defeated  Arthur Ashe /  Roscoe Tanner 6–4, 5–7, 4–6, 7–6, 6–2

References

External links
 ATP tournament profile
 ITF tournament edition details

Astor Cup
1974 World Championship Tennis circuit
Astor Cup
February 1974 sports events in Europe